Calliotropis oregmene is a species of sea snail, a marine gastropod mollusk in the family Eucyclidae.

Description
The length of the shell attains 6 mm.

Distribution
This species occurs in the Pacific Ocean off Fiji.

References

 Vilvens C. (2007) New records and new species of Calliotropis from Indo-Pacific. Novapex 8 (Hors Série 5): 1–72.

External links
 MNHN Paris, Calliotropis oregmene
 Gastropods.com: Calliotropis oregmene

oregmene
Gastropods described in 2007